Laura van der Heijden (born 27 June 1990) is a Dutch handball player for Chambray Touraine Handball in France and the Dutch national team.

Laura van der Heijden started playing handball at the age of six, first at LHV Leusden in The Netherlands. She later played for Venus Nieuwegein and VOC Amsterdam, with whom she won the 2010 Dutch Championship and 2010 Dutch Cup. 

From 2006 to 2010 she also ran for the Dutch HandbalAcademie. 

In season 2010/11, the 1.73 meter tall Right Back (left-handed) player played in the German Bundesliga for VfL Oldenburg, with whom she won the DHB Cup in 2012. Van der Heijden reached the semifinals of the EHF Cup 2010/11 with Oldenburg. 

From the summer of 2014 she played for the Danish first division team Esbjerg. In 2015 she was runner-up and in 2016 she won the Danish Championship and the Supercup. 

In the 2017/18 season, van der Heijden was under contract with the Hungarian club FTC Rail Cargo Hungaria, with whom she became Hungarian runner-up. 

She then moved to the German Bundesliga club SG BBM Bietigheim. With Bietigheim she won the German championship in 2019. From the summer of 2020 she ran for the Hungarian first division club Siófok KC. At the end of October 2020, her contract was terminated by mutual agreement. Shortly thereafter she joined the German Bundesligaclub Borussia Dortmund. With Dortmund she won the German championship in 2021 and in 2022 she became runner-up. 

From the 2022/23 season she is under contract with the French first division club Chambray Touraine Handball.

Van der Heijden has played 244 international matches for the Dutch national team, scoring 733 goals. She competed in the 2011, 2013, 2015, 2017, 2019 and 2021 World Championships. 

With the Netherlands she took also part in the European Championships 2010, 2014, 2016, 2018 and 2020. 

She took part with the Dutch selection at the Olympic Games in Rio de Janeiro (2016) and in Tokyo 2020 (2021).

Van der Heijden won the silver medal at the 2015 World Championships and the 2016 European Championships, and the bronze medal at the 2017 World Championships and the 2018 European Championships. She previously won the bronze medal at the European U-17 Championship (2007). At the 2010 U-20 World Cup in South Korea, van der Heijden finished fifth with her team and finished second in Topscoring list.

At the 2019 World Cup, she WON the WORLDTITLE in the final against the Spanish selection.

References

External links

1990 births
Living people
Dutch female handball players
Sportspeople from Amersfoort
Expatriate handball players
Dutch expatriate sportspeople in Denmark
Dutch expatriate sportspeople in Germany
Dutch expatriate sportspeople in Hungary
Handball players at the 2016 Summer Olympics
Olympic handball players of the Netherlands
Ferencvárosi TC players (women's handball)
Siófok KC players
Handball players at the 2020 Summer Olympics
21st-century Dutch women